Hanthawaddy Mibaya (1536 – June 1606) was the chief queen consort of King Nanda of Toungoo Dynasty of Burma (Myanmar) from 1581 to 1599. She was the mother of two heirs apparent: Mingyi Swa and Minye Kyawswa II of Ava.

Brief
The queen was one of King Tabinshwehti's two children listed in the Burmese chronicles. Her mother may have been Dhamma Dewi.

The princess married her cousin Nanda, the heir-apparent, in 1551. They were at least half-cousins since her father Tabinshwehti and Nanda's mother Atula Thiri were half-siblings, and may have been double cousins if her mother was Dhamma Dewi since Nanda's father Bayinnaung and Dhamma Dewi were siblings. The couple had seven children (four daughters and three sons) from the 1550s to c. 1571.

She became the chief queen in 1581 when Nanda ascended to the throne. Nanda presided over the collapse of the Toungoo Empire over the next 18 years. In 1599, her husband lost power, and the royal couple was sent to Toungoo (Taungoo) by the victor Minye Thihathu II of Toungoo. The victor kept the royal couple well at the palace but his son Natshinnaung assassinated the fallen king a year later. Minye Thihathu was dismayed, and protected the queen. He moved her to stay with her eldest daughter, who was married to his younger brother, Minye Kyawhtin (later known as Thado Dhamma Yaza), with a full retinue of attendants.

The queen spent her last years there, and died in June 1606.

In popular culture 
She appeared in the scene of In Part of the King Naresuan film series ,which a quarter of wife side seated of king Nanda Bayin.

Notes

References

Bibliography
 
 
 
 

Chief queens consort of Toungoo dynasty
1530s births
1606 deaths
16th-century Burmese women
17th-century Burmese women